Mass media in Liberia include the press, radio, television, fixed and mobile telephones, and the Internet.

Much of Liberia's communications infrastructure was destroyed or plundered during the two civil wars (1989-1996 and 1999-2003). With low rates of adult literacy and high poverty rates, television and newspaper use is limited, leaving radio as the predominant means of communicating with the public.

Even as it struggles with economic and political constraints, Liberia's media environment is expanding. The number of registered newspapers and radio stations (many of them community stations) is on the rise despite limited market potential. And politically critical content and investigative pieces do get published or broadcast.

Press
The main newspapers are:
 The Analyst
Pumah Times Newspaper 
 Daily Observer (est. 1981), private.
 The Daily Talk
 FrontPage Africa, private.
 The Inquirer, private daily.
 National Chronicle
 The New Dawn, private daily.
 New Democrat
 New Republic Liberia

Defunct newspapers and magazines include:
 Africa League
 African Nationalist
 Africa's Luminary (est. 1839)
 Amulet (est. 1839)
 Daily Listener (est. 1950)
 Footprints Today (est. 1984)
 The Friend
 Independent Weekly
 Journal of Commerce and Industry
 Liberia and West Africa (ceased in 1932)
 Liberia Herald (est. 1826)
 Liberian Age (est. 1946)
 Liberian Herald
 Liberian News
 Liberian Recorder (est. 1897)
 Liberian Star (est. 1839)
 Monrovia Observer (est. 1878)
 Palm Magazine
 SunTimes
 Weekly Mirror
 Whirlwind

Radio 

 Radios: 790,000 radio receivers (1997).
 Radio stations: 1 state-owned radio station, but no national public service broadcaster; about 15 independent radio stations broadcasting in Monrovia, with another 25 local stations operating in other areas; transmissions of 2 international broadcasters are available (2007).
 BBC World Service 103 FM.
 ELBC FM, public.
 ELWA FM and SW, private, religious-Christian.
Pumah FM 106.3
 LUX 106.6 FM, University of Liberia.
 Radio Liberia FM, operated by the state-run Liberian Broadcasting System (LBS).
 Radio Veritas FM and SW, religious-Catholic.
 RFI English FM, the English service of Radio France Internationale.
Sky FM
STAR Radio FM and SW, operated in partnership with Swiss-based Hirondelle Foundation.
 Truth FM
 UNMIL Radio FM, operated by the United Nations mission.
 Voice of Firestone Liberia 89.5 FM

Television 
 Television sets: 70,000 sets (1997).
Pumah TV Channel 4
 Television stations: 4 private TV stations, none with national reach; satellite TV service available (2007).
 Clar TV, private.
 DC TV, private.
 Power TV, private.
 Real TV, private.
 Liberia Broadcasting System: Government owned Liberia National Television (LNTV).

Telephones

 Calling code: +231 
 International call prefix: 00
 Main lines: 3,200 lines in use, 213th in the world (2011).
 Mobile cellular: 2.4 million lines, 138th in the world (2012). 
 Telephone system: the limited services available are found almost exclusively in the capital Monrovia; fixed-line service stagnant and extremely limited; telephone coverage extended to a number of other towns and rural areas by four mobile-cellular network operators; mobile-cellular subscription base growing and teledensity reached 50 per 100 persons (2011).
 Satellite earth stations: 1 Intelsat (Atlantic Ocean) (2010). 
 Communications cables: Africa Coast to Europe (ACE) cable system, links countries along the west coast of Africa to each other and on to Portugal and France.

The fixed line infrastructure of Liberia was nearly completely destroyed during the civil wars (1989-1996 and 1999-2003).

Prior to the passage of the Telecommunications Act of 2007, the state-owned Liberia Telecommunications Corporation (LIBTELCO) held a legal monopoly for all fixed line services in Liberia, and remains the sole licensed fixed line telephone service provider in the country.

Two licensed GSM cellular mobile service providers operate in the country: Lonestar Cell and CellCom. Approximately 45% of the population has cell phone service.

Internet
 Top-level domain: .lr
 Internet users: 
 317,717 users; 7.3% of the population, 158th in the world (2016 est.).
   20,000 users, 194th in the world (2009).
 Fixed broadband: 78 subscriptions, 193rd in the world; less than 0.05% of the population, 192nd in the world (2012).
 Wireless broadband: Unknown (2012).
 Internet hosts: 7 hosts, 228th in the world (2012).
 IPv4: 13,312 addresses allocated, less than 0.05% of the world total, 3.4 addresses per 1000 people (2012).

Notable commercial websites

While Liberia's commercial internet sector is still behind the majority of African countries there are still a few classifieds sites:
 liberiacommerce.com

Internet censorship and surveillance
There are no government restrictions on access to the Internet or reports that the government monitors e-mail or Internet chat rooms.

The constitution provides for freedom of speech and press, and the government generally respects these rights in practice. Libel and national security laws place some limits on freedom of speech. Individuals can generally criticize the government publicly or privately without reprisal. Some journalists practice self-censorship.
The constitution prohibits arbitrary interference with privacy, family, home, or correspondence, and the government generally respects these prohibitions in practice.

President Sirleaf endorsed and signed the World Association of Newspapers and News Publishers' Declaration of Table Mountain in Monrovia on 21 July 2012, committing to the core principles of a free press and calling for the repeal of the criminal defamation and insult laws regularly used against journalists.

See also

 Liberia Telecommunications Corporation, the sole provider of fixed line telephone services in Liberia.
 Cable Consortium of Liberia, a public-private partnership formed in 2010 to own and operate Liberia's cable landing point for the ACE cable system.
 The Liberian Journal, a US-based Liberian online and print news organization covering issues of interest to Liberians in the Diaspora.
 Cinema of Liberia

References

Bibliography
 
 
  
 
  
 
 
  (Includes information about broadcast media)

External links
Liberia Domain Registration (.lr)
 
 

 
Liberia
Liberia
Liberia